Justicia californica is a deciduous species of flowering shrub native to the deserts of southern California, southern Arizona, and northern Mexico. Its common names include chuparosa (or chiparosa, both colloquial Spanish terms for "hummingbird"), hummingbird bush, and beloperone.

These are usually in shades of bright to deep red, or sometimes yellow, with a two-lobed upper lip and a wide three-lobed lower lip that falls open to reveal the inside of the blossom.

It is one of the northernmost distributed species of the mostly tropical genus Justicia.

Hummingbirds visit the bush to feed on the nectar. Other birds eat the sugar-rich flower centers. This plant is sometimes cultivated as a landscape ornamental in desert regions for its bright flowers and to attract birds.

The plant is thought to have been eaten by Native Americans of the Southwest.

References

External links

Jepson Manual Treatment
USDA Plants Profile
Wildflower account
Photo gallery

californica
Flora of Arizona
Flora of California
Flora of Mexico
Plants described in 1844
Flora without expected TNC conservation status